K252 or K-252 may refer to:

K-252 (Kansas highway), a state highway in Kansas
K252a, an alkaloid isolated from Nocardiopsis bacteria
K252 pipe, a diamondiferous diatreme in Canada